Albirhodobacter confluentis is a Gram-negative, strictly aerobic, moderately halophilic  and non-motile bacterium from the genus of Albirhodobacter which has been isolated from estuary sediments from Korea.

References 

Rhodobacteraceae
Bacteria described in 2017